The Ministry of Transportation and Telecommunication is a government ministry of Bahrain. It is headquartered on the 9th, 32nd, and 33rd floors of the East Tower of Bahrain Financial Harbour in Manama.

Agencies
 Civil Aviation Affairs

See also
 Transport in Bahrain

References

External links
 Ministry of Transportation and Telecommunication
 

Transportation
Transport organisations based in Bahrain
Bahrain